څوك غواري چې شي میلیونر؟ (in Pashto, English translation: Who will be the millionaire?, transliteration: Suok Ghwari Chi Shi Millonar?), or کی ميخواهد میلیونر شود؟ (in Persian, transliteration: Ki Mekhaahad Milyunar Shawad?), is an Afghan game show based on the original British format of Who Wants to Be a Millionaire?.

It is shown on both Ariana TV and Shamshad TV.

Values (in afghani)

See also
List of television programs
List of television show franchises

References

External links
Article about the Dari version

2008 Afghan television series debuts
2010 Afghan television series debuts
Who Wants to Be a Millionaire?